Louis Cheung (born 11 January 1980) is a Hong Kong singer, songwriter, and actor. He is an alumnus of The Hong Kong Academy for Performing Arts, majoring in acting. His first play was in 1997, and he has performed in a total of more than 20 stage plays, including the classic "A Streetcar Named Desire", in which he played Stanley Kowalski.

Career
In 1984, Cheung started acting in front of the camera, including a well-known ad for Nestle instant milk's "The dairy cows raised at 15th floor". He has taken part in more than 100 TV shows, movies and ads.

Cheung joined the music industry in 2005, winning "Ultimate Song Chart Awards Presentation - Best Male Newcomer (Bronze)" in the same year, and "Ultimate Song Chart Awards Presentation - Music Composer Award" and "Ultimate Song Chart Awards Presentation - Singer-songwriter Award." He has received much recognition for his creative achievements. He has also written many songs for other famous Canto-pop singers, such as Eason Chan, Leo Ku, Hacken Lee, Eric Sun, and Joey Yung. His famous works include "Woodgrain", "Hard to Detect" and so on.

Cheung joined TVB as a contracted artist in 2012. His first drama as a contracted artist with the station was "Inbound Troubles", playing the supporting role Sung Wai-chiu. In 2013 and 2014, he acted in "Brother's Keeper", "Gilded Chopsticks", "Black Heart White Soul" and "Come On, Cousin," receiving critical acclaim for his ability to do both comedy and drama. He received five nominations at the TVB Anniversary Awards in 2014, and ultimately won the "Most Improved Actor" award. In 2015, he starred in "Raising the Bar" as Quinton Chow Chi-pok, the second male lead. In August 2015, he was promoted to leading actor for the first time, starring in Momentary Lapse of Reason with Best Actress winner Tavia Yeung, newcomer Lin Xiawei, and Matt Yeung.

Personal life
Cheung married singer Kay Tse in 2007. They were both students in a Tai Po high school. Their son, James, was born that same year. Their daughter, Karina, was born in 2017.

Discography

Studio albums
To Be or Not To Be (2005)
將繼衝 (2006)
Kidult (2007)
Check Point (2007)
Rock N Break (2008)
B.C (2009)
456 (2010)
5+ (2011)
X (2014)

Singles

(*)Currenting charting

Songwriting Works For Other Singers
As Composer:
"九" by Jeremy Lee (2022) 
"越州公路193" by Denis Kwok (2022)

Filmography

Film and television

Music Videos
 ERROR - Love On Duty (愛情值日生) (2022)

Awards and nominations

Acting

Music 
2008 Metro Hit Music Awards: 循環線 was a song composed by Louis himself which won the newly composed award #1.
Commercial Radio Hong Kong – 2007 Ultimate (Chik Chak) Best composer award (叱咤樂壇作曲人 大獎)
Commercial Radio Hong Kong – 2007 Ultimate (Chik Chak) Producer/singer silver award (叱咤唱作人銀獎)

References

External links

IMDb profile: Kai-chung Cheung

Date of birth unknown
Living people
Alumni of The Hong Kong Academy for Performing Arts
Cantopop singers
Hong Kong male film actors
Hong Kong male singers
Hong Kong singer-songwriters
Hong Kong male television actors
21st-century Hong Kong male actors
1980 births